The AAPS Journal is a bimonthly peer-reviewed scientific journal covering all aspects of pharmaceutical sciences. It is published by Springer Science+Business Media on behalf of the American Association of Pharmaceutical Scientists. The editor-in-chief is Ho-Leung Fung (State University of New York at Buffalo).

Abstracting and indexing
The journal is abstracted and indexed in:
BIOSIS Previews
Chemical Abstracts Service
CSA databases
Embase
Index Medicus/MEDLINE/PubMed
Proquest databases
Science Citation Index Expanded
Scopus
According to the Journal Citation Reports, the journal has a 2021 impact factor of 3.603.

See also
 List of pharmaceutical sciences journals

References

External links

Academic journals associated with learned and professional societies of the United States
Bimonthly journals
English-language journals
Online-only journals
Pharmacology journals
Publications established in 1999
Springer Science+Business Media academic journals